Cassettes Won't Listen is the American indie rock and electronic one-man project, of multi-instrumentalist and record producer Jason Drake, based out of Brooklyn, New York, United States. Over the last few years Cassettes Won't Listen has received press from Spin, Perez Hilton, and URB.  Cassettes Won't Listen has also done official remixes for notable artists such as Aesop Rock, El-P, Midlake, Mr. Lif, Morcheeba and many more.

In 2008, Cassettes Won't Listen covered The Cure's "Let's Go to Bed" for the American Laundromat Records compilation Just Like Heaven - a Tribute to the Cure. They also covered "Need You Tonight" by INXS for Engine Room Recordings' compilation album Guilt by Association Vol. 2, which was released in November of that year.

Cassettes Won't Listen released a covers EP entitled One Alternative on December 11, 2007 as well as a seven-song EP entitled Small-Time Machine on March 11, 2008. Drake released Small-Time Machine himself through distributor, The Orchard, along with his 2009 instrumental record, Into The Hillside.

The track "Freeze & Explode" was used in the February 16, 2009 broadcast of the NBC show Chuck.

On December 3, 2009, Cassettes Won't Listen hosted MTV2's Subterranean, a video show centered on independent musicians.

In October 2010, Cassettes Won't Listen announced a brand new instrumental side project under the name, Dfalt. He launched the project with a free mixtape titled The Stupid Rifle Mixtape and made it available via Dfalt.com, along with a free self-titled EP via Definitive Jux Records.

2010 also saw a resurgence from the producer in terms of remixes under the Cassettes Won't Listen moniker, with remixes for Gold Panda, Daft Punk, The Death Set featuring Diplo, amongst others.

In April 2011, Cassettes Won't Listen announced the release date of his latest album, KEVINSPACEY, on Daylight Curfew, his recently founded artist collective / record label.  On May 12 he was served with a cease and desist from actor Kevin Spacey and his legal team forcing him to change the name of his upcoming record. The "K" was dropped effectively renaming the record to EVINSPACEY.  The record was released on June 21, 2011 via Daylight Curfew.

A new EP, Casa, was released via Daylight Curfew on August 14, 2012. Cassettes Won't Listen issued an essay detailing the process and inspiration behind the release and effectively put the CWL project on hiatus (possibly indefinite) in order to focus on his new project, Dfalt, and record label, Daylight Curfew.

Discography

LPs
 Small-Time Machine (2008)
 Into the Hillside (2009)
 EVINSPACEY (2011)

EPs
 Nobody's Moving  (digital release)  (2005)
 The Quiet Trial  (digital release) (2006)
 One Alternative (Free Digital Release) (2007) 
 Dfalt  (digital release) (2011)
 Casa  (digital release) (2012)

Singles
 The Sidewalk Cruise  (digital release) (2006)

Videos
 Where Did Go (2007)
 Paper Float   (2008)
 Freeze and Explode   (2008)
 Hmmmm   (2009)
 Take Off   (2009)
 Quickly Approaching   (2009)
 Into The Hillside   (2009)

Compilations
"Need You Tonight" (INXS cover) from Guilt by Association Vol. 2 (2008)
"Let's Go To Bed" (The Cure cover) from Just Like Heaven - a tribute to The Cure (2008)

Remixes
 Asobi Seksu - Strawberries (2006)
 The Postmarks - Goodbye (2006)
 RJD2 - De Lalouette (2006)
 Mr. Lif - Brothaz (2006)
 Pela - Lonesome Hearts (2006)
 Midlake - Young Brides (2006)
 Dr. Octagon - Aliens (2006)
 The Diggs - Everyones Starting Over (2006)
 Morcheeba - Everybody Loves a Loser (2006)
 Brookville - Nothing's Meant to Last (2006)
 El-P - Flyentology (2007)
 Aesop Rock - None Shall Pass (2007)
 Midlake - Roscoe (2007)
 The Dears - Demons (2009)
 Dappled Cities - The Price (2009)
 The Death Set - Around The World (2009)
 Mr. Lif - The Sun (feat. Cassettes Won't Listen) (2009)
 Christine - Cool Your Shoes (2009)
 The Faunts - Explain (2009)
 Bisc 1 - Turbulence (2009)
 Gold Panda - You (2010)
 Daft Punk - Derezzed (2010)
 Houses - Soak It Up (2010)
 Homeboy Sandman - The Carpenter (2010)
 Pigeon John - The Bomb (2010)
 The Death Set - Yo David Chase, You POV Shot Me In The Head feat. Diplo (2010)

References

External links
 Official Site
 Myspace Page
 Last FM Page

Electronic music groups from New York (state)
Indie rock musical groups from New York (state)
Musical groups established in 2004
Musical groups from Brooklyn
Remixers